Sultan Shahriar Rashid Khan (died 28 January 2010) was a Bangladeshi army officer who was convicted for the assassination of Sheikh Mujibur Rahman, the founding father and then President of Bangladesh. He was executed by the government of Bangladesh for his role in the coup. On 28 January 2010, Rahman was hanged along with Syed Faruque Rahman, A.K.M. Mohiuddin Ahmed, Mohiuddin Ahmed, and Mohammad Bazlul Huda in Old Dhaka Central Jail.

Career

In 1973 Khan was the Chief Inspector of Army School of Physical Training in Comilla. His friend and colleague, Major Shariful Haque Dalim and his wife, had gotten into a scuffle with the sons of Gazi Golam Mostafa, a politician of Bangladesh Awami League. Some officers ransacked the house of Gazi Golam which led to the officers including Dalim and Major S.H.M.B Noor Chowdhury being dismissed from the army over indiscipline. Khan resigned from the army over this incident. Khan opened a used consumer electronics store named Shery Enterprise in Dhaka.

After his resignation, he maintained contact with some his fellow Army officers both retired and in service. The Army officers expressed dissatisfaction over how Bangladesh was being governed, the lack of benefits for Freedom Fighters, and the role of Sheikh Mujibur Rahman. They held a number of meetings discussing ways to change the government. On 14 August 1975 he met Government Minister Khandaker Moshtaque Ahmed, who was to replace Sheikh Mujibur Rahman. On 15 August 1975, the Army officers including Khan launched the coup. They divided into teams, one went to the residence of Sheikh Mujib, the one Khan was in went to the Bangladesh Betar (radio) office in Dhaka and took control of the broadcast system to control the flow of information.

On 3 November 1975 he helped kill 4 national leaders of Bangladesh in jail, including former Prime Minister Tajuddin Ahmed. After the assassinations, he was appointed under the new chief of Defense staff Khalilur Rahman.

Trial
In 2004 Khan was sentenced to life imprisonment for his involvement in the jail killing case. On 19 November 2009, the Supreme Court of Bangladesh confirmed the death sentence handed out to 12 individuals for their role in the coup and assassination.

Death and legacy
Khan was hanged with 4 of his co-conspirators on 27 January 2010 by the Government of Bangladesh. His daughter Shehnaz Rashid Khan and her brother in law, along with two others were arrested with the contraband Ya ba on 7 August 2011.

References

Assassination of Sheikh Mujibur Rahman
People convicted of murder by Bangladesh
2010 deaths
Bangladeshi lieutenant colonels
Executed Bangladeshi people
People executed by Bangladesh by hanging
Place of birth missing
Year of birth missing